Chester Allen "Chet" Bitterman III (November 30, 1952 – March 1981) was an American linguist and Christian missionary who was kidnapped and killed by revolutionaries of the 19th of April Movement (M-19) in Colombia in 1981.

Originally from Lancaster, Pennsylvania, Bitterman attended Columbia Bible College in South Carolina, where he first heard of the Christian mission organization Wycliffe Bible Translators.  After graduation, he received linguistics training from the Summer Institute of Linguistics (SIL) in North Dakota, and married Brenda Gardner, a fellow alumna of SIL's training program.  Together, they traveled to Colombia to begin mission work with Wycliffe in 1979.

As an inexperienced missionary, Bitterman was not immediately assigned to a tribal group where he could begin to translate the Bible into a new language as many Wycliffe missionaries do.  Instead, he worked primarily at Wycliffe's base in Lomalinda, first working in the radio tower and later serving as security coordinator.  Their time at Lomalinda was broken up by a six-month service trip in Bogotá where Bitterman and his wife assisted a more experienced translator couple.  However, by 1981, plans began to fall into place for Bitterman and his wife to attempt to reach the Carijona tribe in the Colombian jungle.

Abduction and execution 
At 6:30 a.m. on January 19, 1981, seven M-19 guerrillas entered SIL's housing facility in Bogotá, where the Bittermans were staying at the time. Not finding Al Wheeler—whom they believed to be the director of SIL's Colombia Branch—they kidnapped Bitterman instead.  Several days later, the guerillas demanded that SIL leave the country.  Finally, 48 days after his abduction, on March 7, 1981, Bitterman's body was found in a bus near Bogotá, having been shot in the chest.

There was found an entry in Chet's journal written nearly two years before his death that read. "The situation in Nicaragua is getting worse. If Nicaragua falls, I guess the rest of Central America will too. Maybe this is just some kind of self-inflicted Martyr complex, but I find this recurring thought that perhaps God will call me to be martyred in His service in Colombia. I am willing."

References

Further reading

External links

1952 births
1981 deaths
American evangelicals
American Protestant missionaries
Protestant missionaries in Colombia
20th-century Protestant martyrs
Columbia International University alumni
Deaths by firearm in Colombia
People murdered in Colombia
People from Lancaster, Pennsylvania
American expatriates in Colombia
Date of death unknown
Missionary linguists